Sporting Club de Lutxana is a football team based in Barakaldo in the autonomous community of Basque Country. Founded in 1919, the team plays in Territorial Primera División. The club's home ground is Serralta, which has a capacity for 1,995 spectators.

Season to season

1 season in Tercera División

References

Football clubs in the Basque Country (autonomous community)
Association football clubs established in 1919
Divisiones Regionales de Fútbol clubs
1919 establishments in Spain

Barakaldo